Garibaldi is an Italian surname. Notable people with the surname include:

 Anita Garibaldi (1821–1849), Brazilian wife and comrade-in-arms of Giuseppe Garibaldi
 Bob Garibaldi (born 1942), American baseball player 
 David Garibaldi (artist) (born 1982), American performance artist
 David Garibaldi (musician) (born 1946), American musician
 Giuseppe Garibaldi (1807–1882), revolutionary and a father of modern Italy
 Giuseppe Garibaldi (composer) (1819–1908), Italian composer and organist
 Giuseppe Garibaldi II (1879–1950), Italian soldier, grandson of Giuseppe Garibaldi
 Joseph Garibaldi (1863-1941), French painter
 Navarone Garibaldi (born 1987), Los Angeles-based musician, son of Priscilla Presley 
 Ricciotti Garibaldi (1847–1924), Italian soldier, son of Giuseppe and Anita Garibaldi
 Silvano Raggio Garibaldi (born 1989), Italian footballer

Fictional characters 
 Harry Garibaldi in Hill Street Blues
 Galleria Garibaldi in The Cheetah Girls
 Michael Garibaldi in Babylon 5

See also
 Gariboldi

Italian-language surnames